Leptomantispa pulchella is a species of mantidfly in the family Mantispidae. It is found in the Caribbean Sea, Central America, and North America.

References

Further reading

 
 

Hemerobiiformia
Articles created by Qbugbot
Insects described in 1912